Evergestis aridalis is a moth in the family Crambidae. It was described by William Barnes and James Halliday McDunnough in 1914. It is found in North America, where it has been recorded from California and Nevada.

The wingspan is about 27 mm. Adults are on wing from May to June and in August.

References

Evergestis
Moths described in 1914
Moths of North America